This is the list of the proper names for the stars in the constellation Lepus. (Used in modern Western astronomy and uranography only).

List

Etymologies

α Lep 
 Arneb, Elarneb:
 ＜  (ar) arnab, "hare" ＜ (sci.-ar) al-Arnab, "the Hare", for the whole constellation.
 Arsh:
 ＜ (ar) ‘arsh, throne ＜ (ind.-ar) ‘Arsh al-Jawzā', "the Throne of Jawzā'", for α, β, γ, δ Lep.

β Lep 
 Nihal:
 ＜ (ar) nihāl, "quenching their thirst" ＜ (ind.-ar) al-Nihāl, "(the Camels ) Beginning to Quench Their Thirst", for α, β, γ, δ Lep.

See also 
 List of stars in Lepus
 List of star names

Notes

References 
 
 

Lepus (constellation)
Lepus